, translated as Electroid Zaborger 7, was a Japanese tokusatsu television series that aired in 1974. Produced by P Productions, it was the production company's seventh tokusatsu series, following Tetsujin Tiger Seven and preceding Bouken Rockbat.

The series stars Takehisa Yamaguchi (Joji Yuki/Riderman in Kamen Rider V3) as secret agent Yutaka Daimon. The robot Denjin Zaborger has no personality at all. It is Takehisa Yamaguchi as the wild warrior Yutaka Daimon who gives the series its heart.

A movie remake titled Karate-Robo Zaborgar was released in 2011.

Story
 agent  returns to Japan after learning his father was murdered by the evil , leader of the criminal gang . From his father Yutaka inherited the robot warrior , made out of the mysterious metal  which responds to Yutaka's voice commands. Zaborger has the unique ability to transform into a motorcycle, for Yutaka Daimon to ride.

She is a cyborg with (in the early episodes anyway) the ability to transform into a masculine appearing robot warrior. Ruling Sigma with Dr. Akunomiya and Miss Borg are the seven Sigma Executives, leaders of Sigma's various worldwide operations. These nasty cyborgs eventually fall to Yutaka Daimon and Denjin Zaborger. Serving as Sigma's field agents are Sigma Mecha Animals, Sigma Cyborgs, Sigma Group Hitmen (human assassins), Sigma Mecha Borg, Sigma Borg and Sigma Soldiers. Dr. Akunomiya is a cruel and demanding master. He even turns against his most loyal servant Miss Borg, replacing her with a new female aide . By then Sigma is on its last legs so Lady Borg does not last long.

After his cyborgs and robots (even Miss Borg) have failed to eliminate Yutaka Daimon, Dr. Akunomiya assigns the task of getting rid of his greatest enemy to a young assassin, the motorcycle riding . Gen Akizuki's bird shaped motorcycle is called . Gen Akizuki's "Thunder Punch" and "Hurricane Punch" martial arts techniques proved to be a match for Yutaka Daimon's "Flying Dragon Tri-Stage Kick" and gave the hero some tough moments.

After finally defeating Gen Akizuki, in episode 38, Yutaka Daimon and Denjin Zaborger take out the last Sigma robot, in episode 39, and Yutaka Daimon at last comes face to face with his father's killer, Dr. Akunomiya. However, Yutaka is not the only one interested in the demise of Sigma. Another evil group hiding in the shadows hopes for the elimination of a rival. And so Yutaka Daimon and Zaborger's battle to restore peace in Japan has really just began.

To combat this group Yutaka Daimon is joined by a second, younger (and less skilled) Secret Police agent  who rides a bazooka-armed motorcycle called . Starting with episode 41 Machine Zaborger and Machine Bach merge to form , a more powerful version of Denjin Zaborger.

The Dinosaur Army is led by an ancient monster, . It is a three-headed dinosaur/dragon. One head of this ancient beast spits fire, one poison gas and one a bolt of energy. Devil Hat makes the dinosaur shaped robots for the Dinosaur Army and uses his hat like a weapon. Princess Meza is an expert at disguises and serves as a spy. Under these three are the Dinosaur Army Mecha, Dinosaur Army Hitmen (human assassins) and the reptile headed Dragon Face Soldiers.

Music
Opening Theme
 "Tatakae! Denjin Zaborger!" (Fight! Electroid Zaborger!) music by Shunsuke Kikuchi, lyrics by Shozo Uehara, vocals by Masato Shimon

Ending Theme
 "Ore No Kyoudai Denjin Zaborger" (My Brother Electroid Zaborger)  music by Shunsuke Kikuchi, lyrics by Shozo Uehara, vocals by Masato Shimon

Cast
Yutaka Daimon: Takehisa Yamaguchi
Zaborger: Yoichiro Tajiri
Chief Inspector Daigoro Nitta (episodes 1-29): Nagami Jun
Miyo Nitta (episodes 1-39): Midori Hoshino
Hiroshi Nitta: Masahiro Kamiya
Detective Nakano: Eiichi Kikuchi
Dr. Akunomiya (episodes 1-39): Ken Okabe
Miss Borg (episodes 1-35: Ritsuko Fujiyama
Gen Akizuki (episodes 22-30, 34-38) : Ken Kazato aka Yūsuke Kazato
Lady Borg (episodes 37-39): Taeko Yoshida
Devil Hat (episodes 40-52): Takanobu Toya
Princess Meza (episodes 40-52): Mitsuko Tsutsumi
Ken Matsue (episodes 40-52): Tatsuya Sakada

References

1974 Japanese television series debuts
1975 Japanese television series endings
Japanese television series with live action and animation
Tokusatsu television series
Fuji TV original programming